Erechthias acrodina is a species of moth in the family Tineidae. It was described by Edward Meyrick in 1912 using a specimen collected by George Vernon Hudson in Wellington. This species is endemic to New Zealand.

References

Moths described in 1912
Erechthiinae
Moths of New Zealand
Endemic fauna of New Zealand
Taxa named by Edward Meyrick
Endemic moths of New Zealand